Kim-Pascal Boysen (born 19 June 1988) is a German former professional footballer who plays as a forward.

Career
Boysen made his professional debut for Kickers Offenbach in the 3. Liga on 19 December 2008, matchday 20 of the 2008–09 season, coming on as a substitute for Matthias Morys in the 84th minute of the match against VfB Stuttgart II.

Personal life
He is the son of Hans-Jürgen Boysen, who was head coach while Kim-Pascal was at Kickers Offenbach.

References

Living people
1988 births
German footballers
Association football forwards
Kickers Offenbach players
ASV Durlach players
3. Liga players